Sohoton is a place name meaning "narrow opening" in the Visayan languages of the Philippines. It can refer to:
Sohoton Cove, a tourist attraction consisting of a cluster of small islets with lagoons, limestone caves, and rock formations in Bucas Grande Island in Surigao del Norte.
Sohoton Caves and Natural Bridge Park, a protected natural area with a natural bridge, limestone caves, underground rivers, and waterfalls within the Samar Island Natural Park in Samar.